Henry Powell (22 July 1878 – 8 June 1930) was a former Australian rules footballer who played with Carlton in the Victorian Football League (VFL).

Powell was killed in an accident at Croxton railway station in 1930, when he was crushed after falling between the train and the platform.

Notes

External links 
		

Harry Powell's profile at Blueseum

1878 births
Australian rules footballers from Melbourne
Carlton Football Club players
Railway accident deaths in Australia
Accidental deaths in Victoria (Australia)
1930 deaths
People from Malvern, Victoria